This partial list of city nicknames in Alabama compiles the aliases, sobriquets and slogans that cities in the U.S. state of Alabama are known by (or have been known by historically), officially and unofficially, to locals, outsiders or their tourism boards. 

City nicknames can help establish a civic identity, help outsiders recognize a community, attract people to a community because of its nickname, promote civic pride, and build community unity. Nicknames and slogans that successfully create a new community "ideology or myth" are also believed to have economic value. This value is difficult to measure, but there are anecdotal reports of cities that have achieved substantial economic benefits by "branding" themselves by adopting new slogans.

Some unofficial nicknames are positive, while others are derisive. The unofficial nicknames listed here have been in use for a long time or have gained wide currency.

              
Alabaster – The City for Families
Albertville – The Fire Hydrant Capital of the WorldClaims to Fame - Products , Epodunk, accessed April 16, 2007.
Anniston – The Model City
Auburn – The Loveliest Village on the Plains
Bayou La Batre – Seafood Capital of Alabama
Bessemer – The Marvel City
Birmingham
B'ham
Bombingham
The Magic City
The Pittsburgh of the SouthU.S. City Monikers, Tagline Guru website, accessed January 5, 2008
The Steel City
The Tragic City
Cedar Bluff – Crappie Capital of the World
Daphne – The Jubilee City
Decatur
Ballooning Capital of Alabama 
The Chicago of the South
Home of America's First Wave Pool
The River City
Wave Pool Capital of the World
Demopolis – City of the People
Dothan
Condom Capital of the World
The Peanut Capital of the WorldClaims to Fame - Agriculture, Epodunk, accessed April 16, 2007.
Douglas – City of Eagles
Enterprise – City of Progress
Eufaula – Bass Capital of the World
Fort Payne – Sock Capital of the World
Gadsden – City of Champions
Gordo – The Armpit of Civilization 
Greenville – The Camellia CityClaims to Fame - Plants , Epodunk, accessed April 16, 2007.
Haleyville – Home of 911
Hartselle – The City of Southern Hospitality
Hueytown – Home of the Alabama Gang
Huntsville
The Rocket CityHuntsville:  Rocket City, About.com, accessed March 29, 2007.
Watercress Capital of the World
Jackson – The Pine City
Jacksonville – Gem of the Hills
Lincoln – The Motorsports City
Madison – Where Progress Meets Preservation
Mentone – Camping Capital of the World
Mobile
The Azalea City
The City of Six Flags 
The Home of Mardi Gras
The Port City
Monroeville – Literary Capital of the World
Montgomery
 Capital of the South
 The Cradle of the Confederacy
 The Gump
Mountain Brook
Small Kingdom [52]
Muscle Shoals – The Hit Recording Capital of the World (formerly)
Ozark – The Home of Fort Rucker
Prattville
The Fountain City
The Preferred City
Selma
Butterfly Capital of Alabama
Queen of the Alabama Black Belt
Slocomb – The Tomato Capital of the South
Summerdale – The Sunshine City
Sylacauga – The Marble City
Tuscaloosa 
The Druid City
T-Town
Tusca Town
Tuskegee – The Pride of the Swift-Growing South
Union Springs – Bird Dog Field Trial Capital of the World
Vestavia Hills – The Jewel City
Wetumpka – Rumbling Waters
Winfield – City on the Move

See also
List of city nicknames in the United States
List of cities in Alabama

References

External links
a list of American and a few Canadian nicknames
U.S. cities list

Alabama cities and towns
City Nicknames